Pan is an Afro-Asiatic dialect cluster spoken in Plateau State, Nigeria.

Dialects
Dialects are Bwol, Dimmuk (Doemak), Gworam, Jipal, Kofyar (Kwong), Kwagallak (Kwolla), and Mirriam (Mernyang).

Blench (2019) lists the following language varieties in the Pan cluster. Village locations are cited by Blench (2019) from Hon, et al. (2014).

Mernyang: spoken in Dokan Kasuwa, Dokan Tofa, Kwaning, Laardang, Kwang, Kwa, Miket villages
Doemak: spoken in Kofyar Doemak, Goechim, Ba'ap, Kopar, Doemak villages
Tèŋ (Teng): spoken in Nteng, Gyeer, Ɗoop, Kelaghan, Loon, Kwakii, Zhep Morop, Gorom villages
Kwagallak: spoken in Tim, Kopfogon, Chim, Yitiar, Kwoor, Kwalla, Shangfuup, Kopbepang, Moeda villages
Bwol (Bwall): spoken in Dungras, Nakum, Tanba, Bwall, Goepil villages
Gworam
Jipal: spoken in Katul, Kabum, Kanjing, Kaburuk, Shawk, Kaper, rundum, Jipal, Bul, Kwa, Male, Zwakal villages
Shindai

Note that in the villages names, orthographic oe stands for the mid central vowel ə, a practice that had been adopted by missionaries in the Shendam area during the 1930s, such as Father E. Sirlinger.

Notes 

West Chadic languages
Languages of Nigeria